The 1975 William & Mary Indians football team represented the College of William & Mary as a member of the Southern Conference (SoCon) during the 1975 NCAA Division I football season. Led by Jim Root in his fourth year as head coach, William & Mary finished the season 2–9 overall and 2–3 in SoCon play to place fifth.

Schedule

References

William and Mary
William & Mary Tribe football seasons
William and Mary Indians football